FC Elektron Romny was a Ukrainian football club from Romny, Sumy Oblast.

The club played in the Ukrainian Second League from 1997 to 2004.

Honours
Sumy Oblast Football Championship
Winners (1): 1995-96

League and cup history

{|class="wikitable"
|-bgcolor="#efefef"
! Season
! Div.
! Pos.
! Pl.
! W
! D
! L
! GS
! GA
! P
!Domestic Cup
!colspan=2|Europe
!Notes
|}

References

 
Elektron Romny
Football clubs in Sumy Oblast
Association football clubs established in 1962
Association football clubs disestablished in 2004
1962 establishments in Ukraine
2004 disestablishments in Ukraine